Craig Potter (born 18 September 1984 in Irvine), is a Scottish football defender who plays for Kilwinning Rangers.

Career

Potter started his career with Ayr United, but failed to play a senior game for them.

Potter then won a scholarship with Hartwick College in the U.S., and played college football for 4 years, until January 2007, when he returned to Scotland to sign for Airdrie United. He appeared 6 times for them, and was released at the end of the season.

In August 2007, Potter was signed by Colin Hendry for Clyde on a short-term deal, after impressing in a trial. He made his Clyde debut on the opening day of the season in a 3–2 defeat against Greenock Morton on 4 August 2007.

Potter's one-month contract was not extended, and he left Clyde in September 2007. He joined Dumbarton shortly after. He played 23 league games for the Sons before his release at the end of the 2007–8 season. Dropping down to Junior level, he has since played for Cumnock Juniors and Dalry Thistle before joining Glenafton in June 2011.

Potter is the cousin of former Clyde captain and current St Mirren defender John Potter.

See also
2007–08 Clyde F.C. season

References

External links

Living people
1984 births
Scottish footballers
Ayr United F.C. players
Airdrieonians F.C. players
Clyde F.C. players
Dumbarton F.C. players
Scottish Football League players
Dalry Thistle F.C. players
Cumnock Juniors F.C. players
Troon F.C. players
Glenafton Athletic F.C. players
Scottish expatriate footballers
Expatriate soccer players in the United States
Scottish expatriate sportspeople in the United States
Association football defenders